Patrick Fitzsimons STD (1695–1769) was  an Irish Roman Catholic bishop in the second half of the 18th century.

Fitzsimons was educated at the Jesuit run English College of St Gregory in Seville, was ordained priest in 1718. He was appointed Archbishop of Dublin in 1763. He died in post on 2 October 1769.

Notes

1695 births
1769 deaths
18th-century Roman Catholic archbishops in Ireland
Roman Catholic archbishops of Dublin